Take the Money and Run is a piece of artwork by Jens Haaning, commissioned by the KUNSTEN Museum of Modern Art Aalborg in Denmark in 2021. The artwork consists of an empty canvas, intended to act as a commentary on poor work wages.

The Kunsten Museum commissioned Haaning to reproduce two of his earlier pieces in which he represented the annual wages of Austrian and Danish workers by framing piles of kroner and euro bills, offering the artist with 532,549 Danish kroner to use for the reproductions; instead, Haaning delivered two blank canvases to the museum. The museum demanded that Haaning return the money that was originally intended for the artwork, and in turn triggered a response from the author:

Kunsten Museum has since filed a civil lawsuit to recover the money from Haaning.

References

2021 in art
Works by Danish people